Kerkythea is a standalone rendering system that supports raytracing and Metropolis light transport, uses physically accurate materials and lighting, and is distributed as freeware. Currently, the program can be integrated with any software that can export files in obj and 3ds formats, including 3ds Max, Blender, LightWave 3D, SketchUp, Silo and Wings3D.

History
Kerkythea started development in 2004 and released its first version in April 2005. Initially it was only compatible with Microsoft Windows, but an updated release in October 2005 made it Linux compatible. As of January 2016, it is also available for Mac OS X. In May 2009 it was announced that the development team started a new commercial renderer, although Kerkythea will be updated and it will stay free and available. A new version called 'Boost' has been released in 2013.

In June 2018 the main developer announced the third version of Kerkythea called "Kerkythea 2018 Boost".

Exporters
There are 6 official exporters for Kerkythea.

Blender
Blend2KT
Exporter to XML format
3D Studio Max
3dsMax2KT 3dsMax Exporter
Maya
Maya2KT Maya Exporter
GMax
GMax2KT GMax Exporter
SketchUp
SU2KT SketchUp Exporter
SU2KT Light Components

Features
Supported 3D file formats
3DS format
OBJ format
XML (internal) format
SIA (Silo) format (partially supported)

Supported image formats
All supported by FreeImage library (JPEG, BMP, PNG, TGA and HDR included)

Supported materials
Matte
Perfect reflections/refractions
Blurry reflections/refractions
Translucency (SSS)
Dielectric material
Thin glass material
Phong shading material
Ward anisotropic material
Anisotropic Ashikhmin material
Lafortune material
Layered material (additive combination of the above with use of alpha maps)

Supported shapes
Triangulated meshes
Sphere
Planes

Supported lights
Omni light
Spot light
Projector light
Point diffuse
Area diffuse
Point light with spherical soft shadows
Ambient lighting
Sky lighting (Physical sky, SkySphere bitmap (normal or HDRI))

Supported textures
Constant colors
Bitmaps (normal and HDRI)
Procedurals (Perlin noise, marble, wood, windy, checker, wireframe, normal ramp, Fresnel ramp)
Any weighted or multiplicative combination of the above

Supported features
Bump mapping
Normal mapping
Clip mapping
Bevel mapping (an innovative KT feature)
Edge outlining
Depth of field
Fog
Isotropic volume scattering
Faked caustics
Faked translucency
Dispersion
Anti-aliasing (Texture filtering, edge antialiasing)
Selection rendering
Surface and material instancing

Supported camera types
Planar projection (Pinhole, thin lens)
Cylindrical pinhole
Spherical pinhole

Supported rendering techniques
Classic ray tracing
Path tracing (Kajiya)
Bidirectional path tracing (Veach & Guibas)
Metropolis light transport (Kelemen, Kalos et al.)
Photon mapping (Jensen) (mesh maps, photon maps, final gathering, irradiance caching, caustics)
Diffuse interreflection (Ward)
Depth rendering
Mask rendering
Clay rendering

Application environment
OpenGL real-time viewer (basic staging capabilities)
Integrated material editor
Easy rendering customization
Sun/sky customization
Script system
Command line mode

See also
 YafaRay, free and open-source ray tracing software that uses an XML scene description language.
 POV-Ray, free and open-source ray tracing software
 LuxRender, free and open-source "unbiased" rendering system

References

External links
 
 Kerkythea's Forum, where you can find the new version (release candidate)

3D rendering software for Linux
Freeware 3D graphics software
Global illumination software
Proprietary freeware for Linux
Rendering systems